The 1981 Ms. Olympia contest was an IFBB professional bodybuilding competition was held on August 22, 1981, at the Sheraton Hotel in Philadelphia, Pennsylvania. It was the 2nd Ms. Olympia competition held.

Results

Attended
2nd Ms. Olympia attended - Carolyn Cheshire, Georgia Fudge, Lorie Johnston, Corinne Machado-Ching, Rachel McLish, Kyle Newman, and April Nicotra
1st Ms. Olympia attended - Astrid Aschwender, Vera Bendel, Laura Combes, Lynn Conkwright, Candy Csencsits, Ellen Davis, Kike Elomaa, Donna Frame, Anita Gandol, Lorie Johnston, Debbie Lemmel, Marie Frances Misat, Melinda Perper, Karen Wainwright
Previous year Olympia attendees who did not attend - Stacey Bentley, Lenore Clark, Patsy Chapman, Sandy Conners, Kellie Everts, Anniqa Fors, Suzy Green, Lynda Johnson, Cammie Lusko, Auby Paulick, Mimi Rivest, and Donna Simms

See also
 1981 Mr. Olympia

References

 Scroll Down Page To See Newspaper Articles
 1981 Ms Olympia Results

External links
 Competitor History of the Ms. Olympia

Ms Olympia, 1981
Ms. Olympia
Ms. Olympia
History of female bodybuilding

es:Ms. Olympia
it:Ms. Olympia
he:גברת אולימפיה
nl:Ms. Olympia
pl:Ms. Olympia
pt:Ms. Olympia
sv:Ms. Olympia